Simone McKinnis  is a former Australia netball international and the current head coach of Melbourne Vixens in Suncorp Super Netball. As a player she was a member of the Australia teams that won gold medals at the 1991 and 1995 World Netball Championships, the 1993 World Games and the 1998 Commonwealth Games. She also captained the Melbourne Phoenix team that won the 1997 Commonwealth Bank Trophy. She was head coach when Vixens won the 2014 ANZ Championship and the 2020 Suncorp Super Netball titles. In 1992, McKinnis was awarded the Medal of the Order of Australia and in 2010 was inducted into the Australian Netball Hall of Fame.

Early life and family
McKinnis is one of five sisters. The McKinnis family spent time in Western Australia and New South Wales before eventually settling in Geelong.

Playing career

Early years
McKinnis began playing netball with Geelong-based Herne Hill. She later played for the Melbourne Club at Royal Park. She started in Melbourne Green, alongside Roselee Jencke, before progressing through Reds and Golds and eventually Melbourne Blues.

Esso/Mobil Superleague
During the Esso/Mobil Superleague era, McKinnis played for several teams.  In 1990 she played for Melbourne City, a composite team coached by Norma Plummer that also featured Roselee Jencke and Shelley O'Donnell. Melbourne City finished as champions after defeating Adelaide Contax 52–42 in the grand final. In 1993 she was vice-captain of a Melbourne Pumas captained by Jencke and coached by Norma Plummer. In 1994 she played for Adelaide Garville as an "import player" and helped them reach the grand final. In 1995 and 1996, McKinnis played for Melbourne Pumas in two successive grand finals, finishing as winners in 1996. Her later Pumas team mates included Janine Ilitch, Eloise Southby and Ingrid Dick.

Melbourne Phoenix
In 1997 and 1998 McKinnis captained and played for Melbourne Phoenix in the Commonwealth Bank Trophy. In 1997 she was the league's MVP as Phoenix won the premiership.

Australia
Between 1986 and 1998 McKinnis made 63 test appearances for Australia. She was a member of the Australia teams that won gold medals at the 1991 and 1995 World Netball Championships, the 1993 World Games and the 1998 Commonwealth Games.

Coaching career

Melbourne Phoenix
McKinnis began her senior coaching career with Melbourne Phoenix in the Commonwealth Bank Trophy, serving as assistant coach to Joyce Brown and then Lisa Alexander.

Singapore Sports School
Between 2003 and 2007 McKinnis served as head netball coach at the Singapore Sports School.

Australian Institute of Sport
Between 2007 and 2010 McKinnis served as head coach at the Australian Institute of Sport. During the 2007 season she coached AIS Canberra Darters in the Commonwealth Bank Trophy. She guided AIS to two successive Australian Netball League grand finals in 2008 and 2009. However on each occasion they lost to Victorian Fury.

Australia U21
Between 2008 and 2009 McKinnis served as head coach of the Australia U21 team. She was head coach when Australia won the 2009 World Youth Netball Championships, defeating New Zealand U21  64–46 in the final after going undefeated throughout the tournament.

Tanzania
Between 2010 and 2011 McKinnis served as head coach of Tanzania. She subsequently guided them to third place at the 2010 Netball Singapore Nations Cup.

Melbourne Vixens
McKinnis joined the Melbourne Vixens coaching staff as a support/specialist coach for the 2012 ANZ Championship season. In September 2012 she was appointed Vixens head coach. She subsequently guided Vixens to the 2014 ANZ Championship and the 2020 Suncorp Super Netball titles. McKinnis was named the Joyce Brown Coach of the Year after Vixens were minor premiers in 2017 and again in 2020 after a second premiership. As part of her role as Vixens head coach, McKinnis also serves as head netball coach at the Victorian Institute of Sport.

Sargeant–McKinnis Cup
The Sargeant–McKinnis Cup is awarded annually to the aggregate winner of the two Suncorp Super Netball matches between Melbourne Vixens and New South Wales Swifts. It is named in honour of McKinnis and Anne Sargeant. It was first introduced in 2004 during the Commonwealth Bank Trophy era. Sydney Swifts, Hunter Jaegers, Melbourne Phoenix and Melbourne Kestrels have previously competed for the trophy.

Honours

Player
Australia
World Netball Championships
Winners: 1991, 1995
Commonwealth Games
Winners: 1998
World Games
Winners: 1993
Melbourne Phoenix
Commonwealth Bank Trophy
Winners: 1997
Melbourne City
Esso Super League
Winners: 1990
Melbourne Pumas
Mobil Super League
Runners up: 1995
Winners: 1996

Head coach
Melbourne Vixens
Suncorp Super Netball
Winners: 2020
ANZ Championship
Winners: 2014
Australia U21
World Youth Netball Championships
Winners: 2009
Australian Institute of Sport
Australian Netball League
Runners up: 2008, 2009

Individual awards

References

Living people
Australian netball players
Australia international netball players
Australian netball coaches
Netball players from Victoria (Australia)
Commonwealth Games medallists in netball
Commonwealth Games gold medallists for Australia
Netball players at the 1998 Commonwealth Games
Netball players at the 1993 World Games
Melbourne Phoenix players
Garville Netball Club players
Melbourne Phoenix coaches
Melbourne Vixens coaches
Suncorp Super Netball coaches
Commonwealth Bank Trophy coaches
Australian Institute of Sport netball coaches
Australian Netball League coaches
Recipients of the Medal of the Order of Australia
Australian expatriate sportspeople in Singapore
Esso/Mobil Superleague players
1966 births
1991 World Netball Championships players
1995 World Netball Championships players
Sportspeople from Geelong
Medallists at the 1998 Commonwealth Games